Chipeșca is a village in Șoldănești District, Moldova.Satul Chipeşca este o localitate in Raionul Şoldăneşti situata la latitudinea 47.7622 longitudinea 28.6086 si altitudinea de 168 metri fata de nivelul marii. Aceasta localitate este in administrarea or. Şoldăneşti. Conform recensamintului din anul 2004 populatia este de 1 645 locuitori. Distanța directă pîna în or. Şoldăneşti este de 21 km. Distanța directă pîna în or. Chişinău este de 78 km.

References

Villages of Șoldănești District